Zachary Michael Cregger (born March 1, 1981) is an American actor, comedian, writer, director, producer, and Twitch streamer. He first came to prominence as one of the three founding members, alongside Trevor Moore and Sam Brown, of the New York City-based comedy troupe The Whitest Kids U' Know. He later starred in the sitcoms Friends with Benefits, Guys with Kids, and Wrecked. He also starred in the film Miss March, which he co-directed and co-wrote with Moore. In 2022, Cregger wrote and directed the horror film Barbarian, which was a commercial success and opened to positive critical reviews.

Early life
Zachary Michael Cregger was born on March 1, 1981, in Arlington, Virginia. He performed in various comedy and music groups there before moving to Brooklyn, New York where he joined forces with Moore and Sam Brown to start The Whitest Kids U' Know.

When he was in high school he was in an improv troupe, which was called The Nation of Improv. They performed shows at malls and other high school auditoriums.

Career
Cregger and his friends formed the WKUK comedy troupe in 2000 while still in college. Later on, he met Darren Trumeter while shooting an independent film and asked him to join them. Trumeter became the second of two later additions to the troupe, the first being Timmy Williams.

Cregger, along with the troupe, garnered great success while performing live in New York City at LES music venue Pianos and on the internet. This led to an invitation in 2006 to the HBO U.S. Comedy Arts Festival in Aspen. The troupe won the award for Best Sketch Group and attracted the attention of many Hollywood executives.

The Whitest Kids U' Know ran for five seasons first on FUSE and then on IFC.

In 2008, Cregger made his first film appearance in Deb Hagan's directorial debut College, starring alongside  Drake Bell.

He directed his second feature film with Moore called The Civil War on Drugs. It had a limited theatrical release and was ultimately aired during the fifth season of WKUK. Afterwards, he toured with the WKUK and performed in live shows. He has participated in several independent movies.

Cregger joined the cast of the NBC sitcom Friends with Benefits, which began airing on August 5, 2011. He then starred on the NBC sitcom Guys with Kids, which aired for one season in 2012–2013. Cregger next starred in the TBS show Wrecked.

Cregger wrote and directed the 2022 horror film Barbarian, starring Bill Skarsgård, Georgina Campbell, and Justin Long.

Cregger, along with the surviving members of The Whitest Kids U'Know, is currently crowdfunding the second feature from the troupe, Mars.

Cregger is set to direct Weapons, a horror film based on a screenplay also written by Cregger.

Personal life
In 2018, Cregger became engaged to his longtime girlfriend Sara Paxton. They married on October 27, 2019.

Filmography

Television

Film

References

External links
 Official Twitter account
 

1981 births
American male film actors
American film directors
American male screenwriters
American male television actors
American television directors
American television writers
Living people
The Field School alumni
American male television writers
21st-century American male actors